Palatine Township is one of 29 townships in Cook County, Illinois, United States. As of the 2010 census, its population was 112,994. It is the north central township of the six northwest townships that form the Cook County panhandle. Palatine Township was organized in 1850.

Geography

Cities, towns, villages
 Arlington Heights (Portions west of Wilke Road, like Arlington Park)
 Barrington
 Deer Park
 Hoffman Estates Northeast area
 Inverness
 Palatine 
 Rolling Meadows (north of Central Road)
 Schaumburg
 South Barrington

Adjacent townships
 Ela Township, Lake County (north)
 Vernon Township, Lake County (northeast)
 Wheeling Township (east)
 Elk Grove Township (southeast)
 Schaumburg Township (south)
 Barrington Township (west)
 Cuba Township, Lake County (northwest)

Cemeteries
The township contains these cemeteries: Cady, Circle of Life, Deer Grove, German, Hillside, Immanuel Lutheran, Mount Hope, Saint Michael, Salem, Sutherland and Wolfum.  
Of these, the Township owns Cady, Hillside, Salem, Sutherland and Wolfum.

Major highways
  U.S. Route 12
  U.S. Route 14
  Illinois Route 53
  Illinois Route 62
  Illinois Route 68

Lakes
 Baker Lake
 Deer Grove Lake
 Deer Lake
 Hidden Lake
 Inverness Lake
 Lake Irene
 Lake Louise
 Lake Rossiter
 Shadow Lake
 Virginia Lake

Landmarks
 Barrington Forest Preserve (east three-quarters)
 Deer Grove Forest Preserve
 William Rainey Harper College
 Arlington Park

Demographics

Government
Supervisor
Andy-John G. Kalkounos 
Clerk
Lisa Moran 
Assessor
Terry Kelly 
Highway Commissioner
Aaron Del Mar 
Trustees 
A. Christine Svenson 
Leslie Bolanos 
Michael Smolka 
Bill Pohlman

Political districts
 Illinois's 8th congressional district
 Illinois's 6th congressional district
 State House District 51
 State House District 54
 State House District 56
 State House District 57
 State House District 66
 State Senate District 26
 State Senate District 27
 State Senate District 28
 State Senate District 29
 State Senate District 33

References
 
 United States Census Bureau 2007 TIGER/Line Shapefiles
 United States National Atlas

External links
 Palatine Township official website
 City-Data.com
 Illinois State Archives
 Township Officials of Illinois
 Cook County official site

Townships in Cook County, Illinois
Populated places established in 1850
Townships in Illinois
1850 establishments in Illinois